Photo L.A. is an international art photography fair held annually in Los Angeles, California. Established in 1992, it is the longest-running international photographic showcase in the western United States. Between ten and eighteen thousand attendees have visited the fair annually.

History 
Founded in 1992 by photography dealer and gallerist Stephen Cohen, Photo L.A. has hosted over 700 international galleries, private dealers, and publishers. The first Photo L.A. was a table-top exposition at Butterfield & Butterfield auction house on Sunset Boulevard in Los Angeles, California.

In 2011, Photo L.A. joined artLA Projects, a citywide program of art installations, exhibitions, seminars, and conversations at the Santa Monica Civic Auditorium. In 2014, it moved to The REEF/LA Mart building in Downtown Los Angeles.

In 2018, Claudia James Bartlett became owner and director of Photo L.A.

In 2019, Photo L.A. moved to the Barker Hangar, Santa Monica. The hangar’s 35,000 square foot space hosted 60+ galleries, collectives, non-profit organizations, art schools, and booksellers from China, France, the Netherlands, Switzerland, Hungary, Peru, and more. The opening night honored LA-based artist Jo Ann Callis and benefitted Venice Arts. 

In response to the COVID-19 pandemic during June 2020, Photo L.A. hosted its first art photography virtual fair, Virtual Collect & Connect. Over 75 galleries and dealers participated in the inaugural virtual edition with interactive 3-D exhibitor booths, Zoom lecture panels, and had virtual installation showcases presented by the J. Paul Getty Museum and the Philadelphia Museum of Art.

Photo L.A. hosts a content series during each fair, with lectures, panel discussions, and docent tours led by professionals in photography.

Past honorees 
Weston Naef, James Welling, Catherine Opie, Jo Ann Callis, Anthony Hernandez

References 

Art fairs
Photography festivals